Aga Gemutra Damarga Soemarno (born 21 June 1966) is an Indonesian former professional tennis player.

Soemarno, born in Bandung, is the only son of Indonesian national tennis player Yolanda Soemarno. One of his two sisters, Tanya, was also a tennis player and reached a world ranking of 281.

A collegiate tennis player for Ferris State University, Soemarno won the 1989 NCAA Division II doubles championships partnering Kurt Hammerschmidt.

Soemarno won two bronze medals for Indonesia at the 1991 Southeast Asian Games.

In 1994 he made the only ATP Tour main draw appearances of his career, in the Jakarta Open doubles event.

His sons, Armando, Fabian and Giorgio, have all played professional tennis.

References

External links
 
 

1966 births
Living people
Indonesian male tennis players
Ferris State Bulldogs
College men's tennis players in the United States
Sportspeople from Bandung
Competitors at the 1991 Southeast Asian Games
Southeast Asian Games medalists in tennis
Southeast Asian Games bronze medalists for Indonesia